The 1993–94 season was the 63rd season for Real Madrid CF in La Liga.

Summary
Real Madrid endured a turbulent season, finishing fourth in La Liga. The team extended its increasingly frustrating run of failing to win the league title to four years. Early in the season, Madrid was nearly sunk to the relegation zone after three straight defeats in four league matches. In March, Benito Floro was fired after a 2-1 defeat against UE Lleida, with the club hiring Vicente del Bosque as an interim manager until 30 June 1994 before former Real Madrid legend Jorge Valdano taking over in July.

Real also suffered a nasty Copa del Rey exit after a 1–5 aggregate loss to Tenerife in the quarter-finals and a European Cup Winners' Cup elimination as a result of a 1–2 aggregate defeat against Paris Saint-Germain in the quarter-finals.

The only trophies won during the season were the 1993 Supercopa de España and 1994 Copa Iberoamericana.

Squad

Source:

Transfers

In

 from Athletic Bilbao
 from Real Madrid Castilla
 from Slovan Bratislava
 from São Paulo FC

Source:

Out

 to Real Zaragoza
 to Real Zaragoza
 to Real Madrid Castilla
 to Santos FC
 to São Paulo FC (December)

Source:

Competitions

Friendlies
Pre-season

Post-season

La Liga

League table

Position by round

Matches

Copa del Rey

Round of 16

Quarter-finals

European Cup Winners' Cup

First round

Second round

Quarter-finals

Supercopa

Copa Iberoamericana

Statistics

Squad statistics

References

External links
 Madrid – 1993–94 BDFutbol

Real Madrid
Real Madrid CF seasons